Gemma Suzanne Davison (born 17 April 1987) is an English footballer who plays as a winger. She has previously played for Aston Villa, Tottenham Hotspur and Reading whom she joined from Chelsea in 2018. After joining Arsenal at youth team level from Watford Ladies, Davison became a regular player and won several trophies. She also spent time in the United States playing for various American clubs in three separate spells. Davison is a full senior international player for the England women's national football team.

Club career
Davison began her career with Watford Ladies before joining the youth set up at Arsenal Ladies. She progressed through the youth system to establish herself as regular in the Arsenal Squad. She spent the summer of 2008 playing in the United States for New York Magic, before returning to Arsenal and playing every game of the 2008–09 season, scoring seven times. In 2009, she signed for Chicago Red Eleven for their inaugural season.

Buffalo Flash 2010–11 
In 2010 Davison joined Chelsea Ladies pair Eartha Pond and Ann-Marie Heatherson at professional USL W-League club Buffalo Flash.  23 year old Davison was part of the Buffalo Flash squad that won the 2010 USL W-League Championship. Having played just five games in 2010 she proved influential in the final, scoring a goal in Buffalo’s 3–1 win over the Vancouver Whitecaps. In January 2011, after the Flash joined the WPS and renamed themselves Western New York Flash, Davison left Arsenal to re-sign for the club. In 2011, she registered one goal and two assists in 12 appearances helping Western New York Flash to a championship title.

Sky Blue FC 2012 
Davison signed for Sky Blue FC in time for the 2012 season. Before she could play for her new club, the WPS was suspended. She returns to Arsenal Ladies for a fourth spell, having first joined the Club’s Centre of Excellence as a teenager.

Arsenal 2012–13 
Davison rejoined Arsenal in March 2012 along with new signings Kelly Smith and Alex Scott. She joined an Arsenal team that had won the treble the previous season. In 2012 Arsenal retained the FA WSL 1 league title. The 2013 season saw Davison play a key role in win the FA Women's Cup and the FA WSL Cup whilst finishing third in the league. The 2013 season saw Davison selected for the PFA WSL Team of the Year along with fellow Arsenal teammates Jordan Nobbs and Danielle Carter.

Liverpool 2013–14 
On 17 December 2013 Davison signed with current WSL 1 champions Liverpool Ladies. Davison played 14 times and scored 4 goals helping Liverpool to retain the WSL 1 title in 2014.

Chelsea 2015–18 
Davison signed a two-year deal with Chelsea L.F.C. on 24 November 2014 ready for the 2015 season. She made her debut scoring twice in a win against Notts County Ladies. Davison went on to provide six more goals in 26 appearances helping Chelsea lift their first FA WSL 1 title beating Manchester City W.F.C  by two points. Chelsea also went on to do the double by winning their first FA Women's Cup. The 2015 Women's FA Cup was the first to be held at Wembley Stadium and saw a 39-minute goal from Ji So-Yun secure a 1–0 victory over Notts County Ladies in front of 30,710. Davison was integral throughout, often from a position wide on the right as she linked up to devastating effect. Chelsea faced Glasgow City in the first round of the UEFA Women's Champions League beating city 1–0 at home and 3–0 in the away fixture. Chelsea advance through to the round of 16 facing two-time winners VFL Wolfsburg. Chelsea would go on to lose both home and away ending their Champions League run.

In September 2016, it was announced that Davison had signed a new contract until the summer of 2018. In the 2016 season, Davison played in 22 games scoring 3 times as Chelsea finished second in the WSL 1 five points behind Manchester City W.F.C. Chelsea faced Manchester City in the semi final of the women's FA Cup. Davison played the full game as Chelsea scored a winning goal in extra time sending them to final to face Arsenal Ladies. Chelsea had the opportunity to retain their title against Arsenal but failed to score after an early goal from Danielle Carter at Wembley Stadium in front of 32,912 fans. Chelsea Ladies drew VfL Wolfsburg in the first round of the UEFA Women's Champions League after they knocked Chelsea out the previous year. Wolfsburg defeated Chelsea 3–0 in their first game played at Stamford Bridge. The second leg in Germany finished a 1–1 draw and resulted in Chelsea being knocked out of the competition.

Reading 2018–19 
On 8 July 2018 Reading manager Kelly Chambers signed Davison from Chelsea.

Tottenham Hotspur 2019–21 
On 25 May 2020 Tottenham released Davison at the end of her contract.

Aston Villa 2021–22 
On 3 September 2021 it was announced that Davison had joined Aston Villa on a short term contract. It was announced on 4 January 2022 that Davison had left Aston Villa at the end of her contract.

International career
Davison played for England regularly at Under-19, Under-21 and Under-23 level. In April 2009 she received her first call-up to the England senior squad. Her England debut came in July 2009 when she came on as a substitute for Jessica Clarke in the 2–0 defeat at home to Iceland.

Subsequently, out of favour with England coach Hope Powell, in December 2013 Davison was named in the first senior squad by Powell's successor Mark Sampson. She was named on the standby list for the 2015 FIFA Women's World Cup in Canada.

On 7 June 2016 Davison opened her account for England in her 12th appearance in a 7–0 euro qualifying win over Serbia. Having scored her first goal she secured her second international goal just five minutes later, in the opening minutes of the second half, helping England seal qualification to the 2017 European Championship in the Netherlands.

Statistics

International goals
Scores and results list England's goal tally first.

Honours

Club
Buffalo Flash
 USL W-League Championship: 2010
Western New York Flash
 WPS Championship: 2011
Arsenal Ladies
 FA Women's Super League 1: 2012
 FA Women's Cup: 2013
 FA WSL Cup: 2013
Liverpool Ladies
 FA Women's Super League 1: 2014
Chelsea Ladies
 FA Women's Super League 1: 2015, 2017-18
 FA Women's Cup: 2015

Individual 
 PFA WSL 1 Team of the Year (1): 2013

References

External links 

 
 Profile at Women's Professional Soccer (WPS)

English women's footballers
Women's association football midfielders
Arsenal W.F.C. players
Chelsea F.C. Women players
Liverpool F.C. Women players
England women's international footballers
FA Women's National League players
1987 births
Living people
Footballers from Chipping Barnet
Expatriate women's soccer players in the United States
Western New York Flash players
Women's Super League players
Women's Professional Soccer players
USL W-League (1995–2015) players
England women's under-23 international footballers
Reading F.C. Women players
Tottenham Hotspur F.C. Women players
Aston Villa W.F.C. players